The 1886–87 season was the ninth season in the history of West Bromwich Albion Football Club. The club reached the FA Cup final for the second successive season, but again finished as runners-up, losing 0–2 to local rivals Aston Villa. Albion also reached the final of two regional cup competitions, winning the Staffordshire Senior Cup and finishing as runners-up in the Birmingham Senior Cup. In addition, they took part in the Walsall Senior Cup and Birmingham Charity Cup, as well as playing a number of friendly matches.

FA Cup

West Bromwich Albion began their fourth FA Cup season with a 6–0 first round victory against Burton Wanderers, in what was their only home match of the tournament. They followed this up with a 2–1 win away at Derby Junction. Albion's second goal in the match was credited to their goalkeeper Bob Roberts, after his long kick downfield ended up in Derby's goal following a goalmouth scrum. Albion then received a bye to the fourth round, where Tommy Green scored the only game of the game against Mitchell St. George's at Aston Lower Grounds. In round five, a goal from George Woodhall gave Albion a victory over Lockwood Brothers, but a dispute over the goal led to the tie being replayed. Tommy Green scored in the replay, putting Albion into the quarter-finals for the third season in succession. Notts County provided the opposition and two goals from Jem Bayliss contributed to a 4–1 victory for West Bromwich Albion.

In the semi-final, Albion took on Preston North End at Trent Bridge. Preston took the lead, but two goals from Tom Pearson and one from Bill Paddock saw Albion reach the final for the second year running. In the final, the team faced local rivals Aston Villa at the Kennington Oval, to determine which side would be the first from the Midlands to win the FA Cup. Villa's goalkeeper Jimmy Warner made a number of saves in a goalless first 45 minutes, and it was they who took the lead in the second half when Dennis Hodgetts scored. Bob Roberts, Albion's goalkeeper, made no attempt to save the shot, wrongly assuming that Hodgetts was offside. Villa captain Archie Hunter added a second goal for Villa near the end as Albion again finished as runners-up.

Source for match details:

Birmingham Senior Cup

Albion, taking part in the Birmingham Senior Cup for the sixth time, beat Aston Villa in the first round by a Tommy Green goal. The match was played in front of 12,000 spectators, the club's largest home attendance of the season and their largest all-time home attendance in the Birmingham Senior Cup. Albion were also drawn at home in the next three rounds and continued to keep clean sheets, defeating Mitchell St George's 3–0, Derby County 6–0 and Stoke 3–0. The semi-final was held at Stoke's Victoria Ground, where Burslem Port Vale provided the opposition. A Jem Bayliss hat-trick contributed to a 5–1 victory as Albion reached the final for the second season running. They were unable to retain the trophy however, as they lost by a single goal to Long Eaton Rangers at Wellington Road.

Source for match details:

Staffordshire Senior Cup

Participating in their fifth Staffordshire Senior Cup campaign, Albion beat Hednesford Town 8–0 in the first round; Bayliss led the scoring with four goals. Albion were also given home ties in the next two rounds, defeating Stafford Rangers 5–1 and Leek 3–0. The semi-final took place in Burslem; Albion won 3–0 with two goals from Jem Bayliss and one from George Timmins. In the final, at Stoke's Victoria Ground, Albion beat Walsall Swifts 4–0. Two goals from Bayliss and one each from Woodhall and Paddock meant that Albion retained the trophy, winning the competition for the third time in all.

Source for match details:

Birmingham Charity Cup

Entering the Birmingham Charity Cup for the third time, Albion drew 3–3 with Wolverhampton Wanderers in the semi-final. The replay finished goalless after extra time, meaning that a second replay was required. Wolves won the second replay, 3–1.

Source for match details:

Walsall Senior Cup

Unusually for a competition in which they usually entered a reserve team, West Bromwich Albion put out their first team for the Walsall Senior Cup round one match against Crosswells Brewery. Albion won the match 5–2, against a brewery side that included seven former Albion players in their team. West Bromwich Albion's reserve team completed the remainder of the club's fixtures in the competition, losing to Walsall Town in an unspecified later round.

Source for match details:

Friendlies and benefit matches

With league football yet to be established, West Bromwich Albion played in a number of friendly matches throughout the season.

Source for match details:

See also
1886–87 in English football

Footnotes

References 
Citations

Sources

West Bromwich Albion F.C. seasons
West Bromwich Albion